The  was a rural rail line in Miyagi Prefecture, Japan, abandoned on March 31, 2007. Running from Ishikoshi Station in Tome, Miyagi with a connection to the Tōhoku Main Line, extending westward to inland Hosokura Mine Park Mae Station in Kurihara, along central Kurihara.

The line was initially constructed to transport ore from Uguisuzawa's  which was closed in 1988.

Description
As of 2007
Distance: 
Rail gauge: 
Stations: 16
Track: Single
Power: Internal combustion (Diesel)
Block System:
Staff Block (Ishikoshi - Wakayanagi, Kurikoma - Hosokura Mine Park Mae)
Tablet Block (Wakayanagi - Kurikoma)

Infrastructure
The operator introduced diesel multiple units (DMU) during the reorganization in 1995, but the old 750 V DC electric installation remained for economic reasons. It was one of few railways then in Japan that operated with an obsolete semaphore signal system and non-automatic blocking system.

Operation and service
All trains consisted of a single car without a conductor. The fare was twice as high as comparable distances on Japan Railways lines. Only three of the sixteen stations, namely Wakayanagi, Sawabe, Kurikoma were regularly staffed.

History

The closure of Hosokura Mine in 1988 reduced freight traffic. The company had hoped for tourists to the Hosokura Mine Park, an amusement park built at the mine site. But this effort failed to stop the decrease of passengers. Municipalities decided to retain the operator as a third sector (in Japanese sense) in 1993, renamed on April 1, 1995 to Kurihara Den'en Railway.

The company has curtailed investment and maintenance measures and made some efforts to increase passengers. But the rapid shift to car traffic has overwhelmed railways everywhere in Japan since the 1990s. Miyagi Prefecture had subsidized the deficit for several years, but in 2001 gave notice to the municipalities of a future suspension of the subsidy. In December 2003 they decided to close the railway in March 2007.

Timeline

December 15, 1918:  established
December 20, 1921: Ishikoshi - Sawabe
December 17, 1922: Sawabe - Iwasasaki (later Kurikoma)
December 3, 1941: Classification from tramway to railway, renamed to 
December 1, 1942: Iwasasaki - Hosokura Mine (ca. ),  stretch completed
September 21, 1952: Electrified DC 750 V
November 29, 1955: Renamed to 
June 1, 1964: Bus and train services in the area combined to a single company, 
August 31, 1968: Bus service separated to 
February 25, 1969: Renamed back again to Kurihara Electric Railway
March 29, 1987: Hosokuura - Hosokuura Mine freight service closed
November 1, 1988: Hosokura - Hosokura Mine abandoned (in some source on October 27)
June 16, 1990: Hosokura - Hosokura Mine Park Mae opened. Hosokura Station abandoned
December 15, 1993: Mitsubishi Material transferred ownership of the Kurihara Electric Railway to the then five towns (in 2007, 2 cities) along the line
May 1, 1995: Renamed to Kurihara Den'en Railway. Electric operation terminated. Conductorless operation introduced
April 1, 2007: Railway service terminated

Stations

As of 2007. All stations were in Miyagi Prefecture.
Ishikoshi
In Tome
Aramachi
Wakayanagi
Yachihata
Ōokashōmae
Ōoka
Sawabe
Tsukumo
Sugihashi
Toyasaki
Kurikoma
Kurihara Tamachi
Omatsu
Uguisuzawa
Uguisuzawa Kōgyōkōkō Mae
Hosokura Mine Park Mae
In Kurihara

Rolling stock

For service
KD 95 type
Railcar (DMU) built in 1995. Nos. KD 951 to KD 953
KD 10 type
Railcar (DMU) for busy hours, used with conductor. Nos. KD 11, KD 12, previously Nagoya Railroad "Kiha 10" type, nos. "Kiha 15", "Kiha 16"
For maintenance
DB 10 type
Diesel locomotive, 4-wheel. No. DB 101
MC 100 type
Motor car
No. "To 102", "To 103"
Wooden truck (gondola)
No. "Wafu 74"
Wooden wagon
Preserved from electrified period, at Kurihara Mine Park Mae
ED202
Electric locomotive, 2-truck, 8-wheel. Regauged survivour of  era
No. "Wa 71"
Wooden wagon
Left intact in Wakayanagi depot
EMUs used until 1995
M15 type, newly built on regaugement, etc.

In Popular Culture
The Kurihara Den'en Railway line was featured in the non-fiction manga and anime series Tetsuko no Tabi

 
Rail transport in Miyagi Prefecture
1067 mm gauge railways in Japan
2 ft 6 in gauge railways in Japan
Kurihara, Miyagi
Tome, Miyagi
Railway lines opened in 1921
Railway lines closed in 2007